Österdalälven (Swedish: East Dal River, Elfdalian: Sturövę, Sturövin) is a  long river in Sweden that flows southeast through Dalarna. Its sources are Storån, Grövlan and Sörälven and the end point is Djurås, in the municipality of Gagnef, where it connects with Västerdalälven to form Dalälven. Österdalälven flows through the Trängslet Dam and Siljan.

References

Rivers of Dalarna County
Dalarna
Dalälven basin